Norwich is a city and the county town of Norfolk, England.
 Norwich (UK Parliament constituency), former constituency
 Norwich North (UK Parliament constituency), successor
 Norwich South (UK Parliament constituency), successor

Norwich may also refer to:

Places
 Norwich, Ontario, Canada
 Norwich, Jamaica, see Trevor Berbick
 Norwich Township (disambiguation)

United States
 Norwich, Connecticut
Downtown Norwich Historic District, a historic district in Norwich, Connecticut
 Norwich, Kansas
 Norwich, Massachusetts
 Norwich, New York
 Norwich (town), New York 
 Norwich, North Dakota
 Norwich, Ohio
 Norwich, Vermont, a town
 Norwich (CDP), Vermont, the central village of the town
 Norwich, Roanoke, Virginia, a neighborhood in Roanoke, Virginia

People
 Julian of Norwich, 14th century, English mystic and writer
 John Julius Norwich (Lord) (1929-2018), member of the British Foreign Service, academic, historian, and writer

Maritime
 HMS Norwich, the name of three ships of the Royal Navy
 HMS Norwich (1691)
 HMS Norwich (1693)
 HMS Norwich (1745)
 SS Norwich City, 1911 freighter that wrecked on Nikumaroro Island in 1929
 USS Norwich, United States Navy ship, in service from 1861 to 1865

Other uses
 Norwich (HM Prison), a prison of adult males and young offenders in Norwich, England
 Norwich Canary, a type of domestic canary
 Norwich City F.C., a football club based in Norwich, England
 Norwich School of painters, an art movement in Britain in the nineteenth-century
 Norwich Terrier, a breed of dog
 Norwich Union, a British insurance company
 Norwich University, a private military college in Northfield, Vermont
 NORWICH, a WWII postal acronym for "(K)nickers off ready when I come home"